Rue des Boulets is a station on line 9  of the Paris Métro.

The station was opened on 10 December 1933 with the extension of the line from Richelieu - Drouot to Porte de Montreuil. It was originally called Rue des Boulets - Rue de Montreuil, and later Boulets - Montreuil. In 1998 it was renamed after the Rue des Boulets.  The street (which has had its current name since 1672) is part of the old road between Saint-Denis and Saint-Maur.

Station layout

Gallery

References

Roland, Gérard (2003). Stations de métro. D’Abbesses à Wagram. Éditions Bonneton.

Paris Métro stations in the 11th arrondissement of Paris
Railway stations in France opened in 1933